The 2020–21 Israel State Cup (Gvia HaMedina) was the 82nd season of Israel's nationwide Association football cup competition and the 66th after the Israeli Declaration of Independence. The competition started in November 2020.

The cup winners qualified to the 2021–22 UEFA Europa Conference League second qualifying round.

Due to the second COVID-19 lockdown, the two lowest leagues in Israel were postponed. Therefore, it was decided that all teams from the fourth and fifth tiers would withdraw from the competition.

Fourth Round
The 4th round matches were held on 20–21 November 2020.
Eight teams from Liga Alef (Four from each regional division) will compete in this round. the winners qualify to the fifth Round.

Fifth Round
The 5th round matches were held on 19–24 November 2020.
The four winners from the Fourth round and the remaining Liga Alef teams that received a bye in the previous round, will compete in this round. The winners qualify to the Seventh Round.

Seventh Round
The 7th round matches were held on 14–17 December 2020.
Hapoel Jerusalem, Sektzia Nes Tziona, Hapoel Afula and Hapoel Kfar Shalem received a bye to the eighth round.

Eighth Round
Due to the third COVID-19 lockdown, this round was rescheduled. The Eighth Round matches are being held between the 19th and 22 February 2021.

Round of 16
The Round of 16 matches were played on 15–17 March 2021.

Quarter-finals
The quarter-final draw took place on 18 March 2021.

Semi-finals
The semi-final draw took place on 22 April 2021.

Both games were initially postponed by a day After Hamas fired more than 150 rockets into Israel from Gaza, following the Jerusalem clashes. Later, the games were further postponed without a new scheduled date. On 17 May. the games were moved to the Sammy Ofer Stadium in Haifa.

Final

References

State Cup
Israel State Cup seasons
Israel
Israel State Cup